Ladakhi can mean:

 of, from, or related to Ladakh, a union territory in northern India
 Ladakhi language, the Tibetic language spoken there 
 Ladakhis, the natives of Ladakh

Language and nationality disambiguation pages